Abemaciclib, sold under the brand name Verzenio among others, is a medication for the treatment of advanced or metastatic breast cancers.  It was developed by Eli Lilly and it acts as a CDK inhibitor selective for CDK4 and CDK6.

It was designated as a breakthrough therapy for breast cancer by the U.S. Food and Drug Administration (FDA) in October 2015.

On 28 September 2017, it was approved for use in the United States by the FDA for the treatment of certain breast cancers.

Medical uses
Since September 2017 Abemaciclib is approved in the US for "adult patients who have hormone receptor (HR)-positive, human epidermal growth factor receptor 2 (HER2)-negative advanced or metastatic breast cancer that has progressed after taking therapy that alters a patient's hormones".

In studies that compared fulvestrant plus abemaciclib to fulvestrant plus placebo in breast cancer patients, progression-free survival under abemaciclib therapy was 16.4 months on average, as compared to 9.3 months under the placebo arm.

Side effects
Side effects that occurred in 20% or more of patients in studies were diarrhea, nausea and vomiting, leukopenia (low white blood cell count) including neutropenia, anemia (low red blood cell count), thrombocytopenia (low platelet count), stomach pain, infections, fatigue, decreased appetite, and headache.

Interactions 

As abemaciclib is mainly metabolized by the liver enzyme CYP3A4, inhibitors of this enzyme (such as ketoconazole) are expected to increase its blood plasma concentrations. Conversely, CYP3A4 inducers lower plasma concentrations of abemaciclib, as has been shown in a study with rifampicin.

Pharmacology

Mechanism of action
Like the related drugs palbociclib and ribociclib, abemaciclib inhibits the enzymes cyclin-dependent kinase 4 (CDK4) and cyclin-dependent kinase 6 (CDK6). These enzymes are responsible for phosphorylating and thus deactivating the retinoblastoma protein, which plays a role in cell cycle progression from the G1 (first gap) to the S (synthesis) phase. Blocking this pathway prevents cells from progressing to the S phase, thereby inducing apoptosis (cell death).
In vitro analysis using cancer cell lines, it is reported that abemaciclib induces non‐apoptotic cell death characterized by formation of cytoplasmic vacuoles derived from lysosomes. This result suggests that there may be a mechanism of action other than inhibition of a cyclin-dependent kinase.

Pharmacokinetics

After oral intake, absolute bioavailability is 45%. Highest blood plasma concentrations are reached after 8 hours on average (range: 4.1–24.0 hours). When in the circulation, 96.3% of abemaciclib is bound to plasma proteins. The substance is mainly metabolized by the liver enzyme CYP3A4 to N-desethylabemaciclib (M2), and to a lesser extent to hydroxy derivatives (M18, M20) and another oxidative metabolite (M1). These metabolites have high plasma protein binding rates similar to the parent substance.

Abemaciclib is excreted mainly via the feces (81%) and to a small extent via the urine (3%). Its elimination half-life is 18.3 hours on average.

Clinical trials

Successful Phase I and Phase II trials against breast cancer were announced in May and December 2014 respectively.

As of early 2016, abemaciclib was involved in 3 Phase III clinical trials:

 The JUNIPER Study is comparing abemaciclib against erlotinib in patients with stage IV non-small-cell lung carcinoma Due to collect data until September 2017.
 The MONARCH 2 study is investigating the effectiveness of abemaciclib in combination with fulvestrant for women with breast cancer. It is due to end in Feb 2017. In March 2017, Eli Lilly announced that it had met its primary endpoint of superior progression-free survival (PFS) over placebo plus fulvestrant in patients with estrogen receptor positive and HER2 negative advanced or metastatic breast cancer. This result led to the September 2017 FDA approval.
 The MONARCH 3 study is investigating the effectiveness of abemaciclib, plus either anastrozole or letrozole, as a first-line treatment for women with breast cancer. The trial is expected to end in June 2017.

Chemistry
Abemaciclib may be synthesized in a four step manner using a Suzuki coupling, followed by a Buchwald–Hartwig amination with the final step being a reductive amination using the Leuckart reaction.

References

External links 
 

Aminopyrimidines
Benzimidazoles
Breakthrough therapy
Eli Lilly and Company brands
Fluoroarenes
Isopropyl compounds
Piperazines
Protein kinase inhibitors
Pyridines